The Almas Temple is a Masonic building facing Franklin Square at 1315 K St NW in Washington, D.C. It houses Almas Shrine, a sub-group for Shriner's International whose headquarters is located in Tampa, Florida. The edifice is in the Moorish architectural style and features an elaborate, multicolored terra-cotta façade. It was constructed in 1929 by Allen H. Potts, a member of the temple.

The building is five stories in height. It was renovated and relocated about 100 feet westward to its current location in 1987 to make way for a new office complex, One Franklin Square.

In literature 

The Almas Temple is one of the settings in Dan Brown's 2009 novel, The Lost Symbol.

References

External links 

 Almas Temple at the Ancient Arabic Order Nobles of the Mystic Shrine Website

Masonic buildings in Washington, D.C.
Moorish Revival architecture in Washington, D.C.
Shriners
Masonic buildings completed in 1929
Relocated buildings and structures in Washington, D.C.